Cheil Industries was an affiliate of the Samsung Group.

Since its establishment in 1954, Cheil Industries has been a Korean textile firm.

Thereafter, from the 1980s, the company expanded its business areas into fashion, chemicals and electronic chemical materials (ECM).

In October 2014, Cheil Industries submitted plans for an initial public offering, with around $1.41 billion in shares planned for listing on the South Korea Stock Exchange.

History
 1954 Cheil Woolen Fabrics Industries Established
 1961 Exported 3,000 pounds of Jangmi brand carded wool to Hong Kong first
 1965 Obtained a Korean license for Wool Mark from I.W.S.
 1972 Established Cheil Synthetic Fiber
 1976 Changed name to Cheil Industries
 1992 Developed the world's first high-density 1,130,000 carpets
 1994 Succeeded in developing and manufacturing EPS for foundry at the Hwasung R&D Center
 2000 Changed the line of business registered with Korea Stock Exchange to chemicals
 2003 Completed the construction of the Daegu Opera House
 2007 Developed the 'Tempist Stylist' the world's first artificial marble with highly transparent chips
 2013 Fashion business sold to Samsung Everland
 2014 Merger with Samsung SDI Co., Ltd. (changed to 'Samsung SDI Chemicals and Electronic Materials': http://samsungsdi.com/)
After the merger:
 2014 Samsung Everland changed its name to 'Cheil Industries Inc.'
 2015: Cheil announced plans to acquire Samsung C&T for $7.7 billion, in an all-stock transaction viewed as consolidating Samsung heir Lee Jae-yong's control over the Samsung Group. Elliott Associates, an American hedge fund that owned 7.1% of Samsung C&T's stock, opposed the transaction and attempted to block it in court on the basis that it was not in the best interest of shareholders. The merger was approved by the shareholders in July and executed in September 2015. The combined company was named 'Samsung C&T' (http://www.samsungcnt.com/eng/overview/info.do).

Fashion
Cheil Industries began its business by producing textiles since 1954. The company then expanded its business areas into fashion by launching its first men's wear range in 1989. Since then, it has diversified into casual wear, ladies' wear and sportswear.

Cheil Industries was the first Korean fashion company to introduce the just-in-time (JIT) system as part of its restructuring efforts, considerably enhancing management efficiency through reduced lead time in the manufacturing process. It also made moves via consistent brand restructuring initiatives to enter into new business lines that it deems to have high growth potential. Through these initiatives, Cheil Industries was successful in building a profitable business structure, thereby establishing itself as a fashion company.

 MYPORT Footwear Portugal – International Footwear Outsourcing Agency based in Portugal.
 Bean Pole International
 10 Corso Como
 8seconds – a Specialty retailer of Private label Apparel (SPA) brand launched at the beginning of 2012.

In 2013 Cheil Industries sold the fashion business to Samsung Everland in a 1.05 trillion won ($968.6 million) deal. After the merger of Cheil Industries (the chemicals and materials business) with Samsung SDI in 2014 Samsung Everland renamed itself to Cheil Industries Inc. In 2015 Cheil Industries merged with Samsung C&T and the new company was named Samsung C&T.

Other Products

Now part of Samsung SDI Chemicals and Electronic Materials. Samsung SDI bought Cheil Industries for 3.5 trillion won ($3.3 billion) in stock in 2014. Cheil investors received about 0.44 of a share in the enlarged SDI for each share they owned.

Chemicals
Cheil Industries began its chemical business in 1989. The company entered into the polycarbonate [PC] business in 2007. A new PC plant was completed in March 2008 and is now operational. The company also produces flame-retardant ABS, sheet ABS, flame-retardant high-impact PS (HIPS), polycarbonate (PC), heat-recasting ABS for vehicles, and artificial marble.

Electronic materials
Cheil Industries' electronic material business started with the company's development in 1996 of EMC. The EMC business unit of Cheil Industries acquired KOSDAQ-listed Ace Digitech in March 2007 and began a polarizing film business, a core component of liquid crystal display [LCD] panels.

 Semiconductor Materials: Epoxy Molding Compound (EMC), Chemical-Mechanical Polishing (CMP) slurry
 Display Materials: Light Guide Plate, Diffusion Plate, Color Resist (CR), Anisotropic Conductive Film (ACF)
 Material for Secondary Batteries: Electrolytic solution
 Functional Materials: EMS, Paste

See also
 Cheil Industries FC
 Fashion in South Korea

References

 Questar

External links
 

Samsung subsidiaries
Companies listed on the Korea Exchange
Chemical companies of South Korea